Stevan Bates (born 29 November 1981) is a Serbian football coach and former player who played as a defender. He is an assistant coach for the Chinese club Shanghai Port.

Club career
Born in Belgrade, Bates has played in Yugoslavia/Serbia for Železničar Beograd, Železnik and Rad Beograd, in Russia for Alania Vladikavkaz, in France for LB Châteauroux, and in Azerbaijan for FK Baku.

Bates played one league game for Tromsø IL in the Norwegian Premier League 2010 season. Bates did not manage to break into the Tromsø first team squad, and agreed to leave the club after the 2010 season, re-signing for his former club FK Baku.

On 16 January 2014, Bates transferred to China League One side Hunan Billows.

In summer 2017, Bates retired from playing football professionally.

Coaching career
In January 2021, Bates was appointed assistant manager of Ivan Leko at Shanghai Port.

References

1981 births
Living people
Footballers from Belgrade
Serbian footballers
Association football defenders
Serbian expatriate footballers
Serbian SuperLiga players
Russian Premier League players
Ligue 2 players
Azerbaijan Premier League players
Eliteserien players
Persian Gulf Pro League players
China League One players
LB Châteauroux players
FK Rad players
FK Železnik players
FC Spartak Vladikavkaz players
FC Baku players
Tromsø IL players
Khazar Lankaran FK players
Sanat Mes Kerman F.C. players
Hunan Billows players
Expatriate footballers in Russia
Expatriate footballers in France
Expatriate footballers in Iran
Expatriate footballers in Azerbaijan
Expatriate footballers in Norway
Serbian expatriate sportspeople in Azerbaijan
Expatriate footballers in China
Shanghai Port F.C. non-playing staff
Serbian expatriate sportspeople in China